The Kulu language, Ikulu, also known as Ankulu or Ikolu, is a Plateau language of Nigeria. It is spoken by the Bakulu, found in the Zangon Kataf, Kachia and Kauru Local Government Areas of Kaduna State.

References

External links
Kulu wordlist

Central Plateau languages
Languages of Nigeria